The Natchez–Vidalia Bridge are two twin cantilever bridges carrying U.S. Route 84, and 425 across the Mississippi River between Vidalia, Louisiana and Natchez, Mississippi.  It is the tallest bridge in Mississippi (although the demolished Benjamin G. Humphreys Bridge connecting Mississippi with Arkansas was taller by 5 feet, its main spans were located entirely within Arkansas).

The original bridge, built by the Works Progress Administration and completed in September 1940, has only two 8-foot lanes and lacks shoulders. It was originally bidirectional, but now carries all westbound traffic. The newer, eastbound bridge completed in 1988, has 11-foot lanes with inside and outside shoulders. Eastbound traffic  goes into Natchez and connects with US Highway 61, where travelers can continue north to Vicksburg and south to Baton Rouge.

See also
List of crossings of the Lower Mississippi River

References

Natchez micropolitan area
Bridges over the Mississippi River
Bridges completed in 1940
Bridges completed in 1988
Road bridges in Louisiana
Road bridges in Mississippi
U.S. Route 65
U.S. Route 84
Bridges of the United States Numbered Highway System
Cantilever bridges in the United States
Buildings and structures in Concordia Parish, Louisiana
Buildings and structures in Natchez, Mississippi
Interstate vehicle bridges in the United States